Nandi Hills (Anglicised forms include Nandidurg and Nandydoorg) is an ancient hill station built by Ganga Dynasty in the Chikkaballapur district of Karnataka state. It is 10 km from Chickballapur town and approximately 60 km from Bengaluru. The hills are near the town Nandi. In traditional belief, the hills are the origin of the Arkavathy river, Ponnaiyar River, Palar River, Papagni River and Penna River. Watching the sunrise at Nandi Hills is popular with tourists. The first ever SAARC summit hosted by India was held at Nandi Hills in 1986.

Etymology
There are many stories about the origin of the name Nandi Hills. During the Chola period, Nandi Hills was called Anandagiri meaning The Hill of Happiness. It is also perhaps called Nandi Hills because the hills resemble a sleeping bull. Another theory holds that the hill gets its name from an ancient, 1300-year-old, Dravidian-style temple, and for the Nandi (bull), statue situated on this hill.

History

Nandi Hills was developed by Ganga Dynasty in 11th century. It was also used by Tipu Sultan as a summer retreat.

Nandidurga was traditionally held impregnable, and its storming by the army of Cornwallis on 19 October 1791 was one of the most notable incidents of the first war against Tipu Sultan of Mysore. A description of the siege is given in Browne's History of Scotland and the records of the 71st Highlanders.

It later became a retreat for British Raj officials during the hot season. Francis Cunningham built the summer residence here for Sir Mark Cubbon.

The climate at the top of the hill made it of interest to horticulturists. Several species of plant were introduced into an experimental garden. Firminger's manual notes that several species of Anona were grown at this garden and also notes the peculiarity of Hypericum mysorense:

Potato cultivation was introduced for the first time in the neighbourhood of Bangalore by a Colonel Cuppage and continued by the botanist Benjamin Heyne. Heyne brought seeds from St. Helena and these grew well enough that they were supplied in Madras and preferred to those obtained from Bengal. In 1860, tea plants were tried on Nandi Hills by Hugh Cleghorn.

Development

The Department of Horticulture is setting up a one-crore food court. A 30-lakh music stage, located on a three-and-a-half acre grove, will be used to conduct cultural programmes. Furthermore, the Horticulture Department is developing  of land in the Nandi Hills region with the creation of a large-scale exotic botanical garden. A planetarium with an initial one-crore investment is also being constructed. A gondola lift system will connect the peak of the Nandi Hill with the nearby Muddenahalli. Other projects including Prestige Golfshire and QVC Nandi Hills are coming up near Nandi Hills. There are also proposals to construct cable cars, at the cost of 15 to 20 crore, to protect the local environment and reduce the number of vehicles going to the hills.

Notable places of interest

Places of interest in the area include Yoga Nandeeshwara Temple (a Hindu temple in Chikkaballapur district), Tipu's Summer Palace, Tipu Drop, and Skandagiri.

Biodiversity

The vegetation of the hills is typical of high hills. Inside the fort at the summit, many of the large trees are planted exotics such as Eucalyptus and the undergrowth consists of Coffea arabica along with some native species. The forest acts as a substrate for cloud condensation and every morning the trees are covered in water. This allows for many moist forest species of plants and animals.

The hills are very rich in birdlife making it a popular location for birdwatchers and bird photographers. The evergreen forest patch on top of the hill being a favoured wintering location for many migrant species of warblers, flycatchers and thrushes. The forest patch is also home for a relict population of the Nilgiri woodpigeon. A breeding pair of shaheen falcon, the resident race of the peregrine falcon is also often seen at the Nandi Hills. The Malabar whistling thrush, Uropeltid snakes and pill millipedes which are otherwise known only from the Western Ghats ranges are also found here. The hill slopes are the home of the yellow-throated bulbul, a species endemic to the hills of peninsular India.

Hiking and trekking 

Nandi Hills is a destination for hiking and trekking for beginners to intermediate level. Trails in the area include the staircase-based trekking path which starts near Sultanpet village.

, visitors require prior District administration  passes to visit Nandi hills on weekends to manage parking and reduce overcrowding on the hill station. Only  1,000 two-wheelers and 300 light motor vehicles parking is allowed on the hill station. Passes  can be purchased at the Ticket counter at the base of the hill station or  through KSTDC website.  Earlier  Nandi Hills was closed due to Covid restrictions.

References

External links

 State govt's official site
 

Cities and towns in Chikkaballapur district
Hill stations in Karnataka
Populated places in the Western Ghats
Hills of Karnataka
Tourist attractions in Karnataka
Buildings and structures in Chikkaballapur district
Forts in Karnataka
Geography of Chikkaballapur district